The Norfolk Southern Railway owns and operates A vast network of rail lines in the United States east of the Mississippi River.  In addition to lines inherited from predecessor railroads, Norfolk and Western, and the Southern Railway, it acquired many lines as part of the split of the Conrail system in 1999.

List of current lines (both owned and not owned)
Not owned- Only well known secondary lines, delivery trackage and connecting trackage that are not owned by Norfolk Southern are included in division tables; non-well known secondary lines, delivery trackage and connecting trackage not owned by Norfolk Southern are not included in division tables.

List of defunct lines

Defunct Norfolk Southern lines or lines that don't have their own employee timetablehttp://www.multimodalways.org/docs/railroads/companies/NS/NS%20ETTs/NS%20Dearborn%20Div%20ETT%20%231%206-1-1999.pdf Norfolk Southern Dearborn Division Employee Timetable 1999http://www.multimodalways.org/docs/railroads/companies/NS/NS%20Train%20Orders/NS%20TO%204-11-2001x.pdf Norfolk Southern Train Orders Mansfield Station 2001
Bath Secondary- was part of NS Harrisburg Division
Bethlehem Secondary- was part of NS Harrisburg Division
Farmer's Valley Secondary- was part of NS Harrisburg Division
Linden North Wye- was part of NS Harrisburg Division
Streator Secondary- was part of NS Dearborn Division
Sterling Secondary- was part of NS Dearborn Division
Nipsco Secondary- was part of NS Dearborn Division
Junction Yard Secondary- was part of NS Dearborn Division
Bo Secondary- was part of NS Dearborn Division
Harvard Connecting Track- was part of NS Dearborn Division
Amtrak Connecting Track- was part of NS Dearborn Division
Buckeye Line- was part of NS Dearborn Division
Indianapolis District
Bradford Secondary
North Yard Branch- was part of NS Dearborn Division
Cleveland Belt Line (later known as Cleveland Belt - Line Branch)- was part of NS Lake Division
Cleveland Belt Line Bridge track- was part of NS Lake Division
Manhattan Branch- was part of NS Lake Division
Maumee Branch- was part of NS Lake Division
Toledo Maumee Connection- was part of NS Lake Division
South Bend Branch- was part of NS Lake Division, former PRR.
Fort Wayne District- was part of NS Lake Division
Federal District (or Alton Branch)- became the Alton District rail corridor.
Franklin Secondary (formerly known as Franklin Secondary Track)- was part of NS Pittsburgh Division
Harbor Connecting Track- was part of NS Pittsburgh Division
Harding Connecting Track- was part of NS Pittsburgh Division
New Castle Connecting Track- was part of NS Pittsburgh Division
Alliance—Crest District
Pitt—Wood District
Alliance Running Track
South Massillon Branch
Captina Running Track
Yellow Creek Runner
Hugo Industrial Track
Roanoke Belt Line
UM Line- portion from Mansfield, IL to Bloomington, IL (Dean) formally abandoned in 2017, was part of NS Illinois Division

Defunct Norfolk and Western lines (later Norfolk Southern)
Farmville Belt Line (sometimes pronounced Farmville Beltline, later known as Burkeville–Pamplin Belt Line and Burkeville–Pamplin Low Grade Line)- a former Norfolk and Western rail line, created from the Norfolk and Western main line.
Wheeling District- a former Norfolk and Western rail line.
Canton District- a former Norfolk and Western rail line. 
Steubenville Branch- a former Norfolk and Western rail line.
Chagrin Falls Branch- a former Norfolk and Western rail line.
Adena Branch- a former Norfolk and Western rail line.
Carrollton Branch- a former Norfolk and Western rail line.
Zanesville District- a former Norfolk and Western rail line.
Akron District- a former Norfolk and Western rail line.
Connellsville District- a former Norfolk and Western rail line.
St. Louis Terminal- a former Norfolk and Western rail line.
Stanberry District- a former Norfolk and Western rail line.
Council Bluffs District- a former Norfolk and Western rail line.
Hannibal District- a former Norfolk and Western rail line.
Moulton District- a former Norfolk and Western rail line.
Des Moines District- a former Norfolk and Western rail line.
Luther Branch- a former Norfolk and Western rail line.
Columbia Branch- a former Norfolk and Western rail line.

Defunct Norfolk and Western lines (regular)
Main Line- main line of the Norfolk and Western, the majority of the line is still used, but its now represented as separate rail lines.
Lynchburg Belt Line (later known as Main Line (Phoebe to Forest))- a former Norfolk and Western rail line, created from the Norfolk and Western main line.
Shenandoah District (also known as Shenandoah Valley Line or Shenandoah Line)- a former Norfolk and Western rail line; line is still active, but was separated into two rail lines: Roanoke District and Hagerstown District.
Kinney to Duke (or Duke to Kinney)- a former Norfolk and Western rail line.
Radford District- a former Norfolk and Western rail line.
Saltville Branch- a former Norfolk and Western rail line.
North Carolina Branch- a former Norfolk and Western rail line.
Abingdon Branch- a former Norfolk and Western rail line.
Duke's Belt Line- a former Norfolk and Western rail line.
Concord—Forest Low Grade Line- a former Norfolk and Western rail line.
AC&Y District- - a former Norfolk and Western rail line. Built by Akron, Canton and Youngstown Railroad and sold to the new Wheeling and Lake Erie Railway. 
AC&NA Branch- - a former Norfolk and Western rail line.
Massillon Branch- - a former Norfolk and Western rail line.

Defunct Virginian lines (later Norfolk and Western)
Princeton District- a former Virginian Railway rail line which passed down to Norfolk and Western. Formed from the Virginian Railway main line and was combined with Deepwater District to form Princeton–Deepwater District. The Princeton District and Deepwater District rail lines were part of the Kellysville to D.B. Tower rail corridor.
Deepwater District- a former Virginian Railway rail line which passed down to Norfolk and Western. Formed from the Virginian Railway main line and was combined with Princeton District to form Princeton–Deepwater District. The Deepwater District and Princeton District rail lines were part of the Kellysville to D.B. Tower rail corridor.
First Subdivision- a former Virginian Railway rail line which passed down to Norfolk and Western. Formed from the Virginian Railway main line.

Defunct Virginian lines (regular)
Main Line- a former Virginian Railway rail line.
Huff Creek Branch- a former Virginian Railway rail line.
Allen Creek Bridge track- a former Virginian Railway rail line.
Bowyer Creek Branch- a former Virginian Railway rail line.
Laurel Fork Branch- a former Virginian Railway rail line.
White Oak Branch- a former Virginian Railway rail line.
Beards Fork Branch- a former Virginian Railway rail line.
Piney Creek Extension and Upper Piney Creek Extension- a former Virginian Railway rail line.
Eastern Branch- a former Virginian Railway rail line.

Defunct Wabash lines (later Norfolk and Western and Norfolk Southern)
Delta District- a former Wabash Railroad rail line which was passed on to Norfolk and Western. Formerly known as Toledo−Montpelier−1st District. Part of the defunct Toledo to Landers rail corridor.
Gary Branch- a former Wabash Railroad rail line which was passed on to Norfolk and Western. Formerly known as Montpelier−Chicago−4th District and Gary District. Part of the defunct Toledo to Landers rail corridor.
Maumee District- a former Wabash Railroad rail line which was passed on to Norfolk and Western. Formerly known as Maumee–New Haven–5th District.
La Porte Spur- a former Wabash Railroad rail line which was passed on to Norfolk and Western.
8th District- from Bement, Il southward to Shumway, Il where it split into two branches going to Altamont and Effingham, Il.
11th District- from Meredosia, IL to Keokuk, IA
Streator Branch - Streator to Forrest, IL
Pittsfield Branch- Pittsfield to Maysville, IL
Quincy Branch - East Hannibal to Quincy, IL
Champaign Branch- Champaign to Deers, IL

Defunct Wabash lines (regular)
Peru–Tilton–2nd District- a former Wabash Railroad rail line
Chicago to Forest–6th District (or Forest to Chicago–6th District)- a former Wabash Railroad rail line. Metra operates this line from Landers Yard to Manhattan, IL. Track removed south of Manhattan.
Forest to Bement–7th District (or Forest to Chicago–6th District)- a former Wabash Railroad rail line. Portion from Gibson City, IL to Risk sold to BLOL.
Streator Branch–7th District (or Streator Branch)- a former Wabash Railroad rail line
Bement to Effingham- 8th District- a former Wabash Railroad rail line
Tilton to Decatur–9th District (or Decatur to Tilton–9th District)- a former Wabash Railroad rail line
Decatur to St.Louis–13th District (or St.Louis to Decatur–13th District)- a former Wabash Railroad rail line
Decatur–Outer Depot–10th District- a former Wabash Railroad rail line 
Keokuk Branch–11th District (or Keokuk Branch)- a former Wabash Railroad rail line
Outer Depot-Moberly-12th District

Defunct Central of Georgia lines
Convington District- a former Central of Georgia rail line
Athens District- a former Central of Georgia rail line.
Oconee District- a former Central of Georgia rail line.
Americus District- a former Central of Georgia rail line.
Andalusia District- a former Central of Georgia rail line.
Birmingham District- a former Central of Georgia rail line.
Chattanooga District- a former Central of Georgia rail line.
Greenville District (not related to the current NS Greenville District)- a former Central of Georgia rail line.
Roanoke District (not related to the current NS Roanoke District)- a former Central of Georgia rail line.
Dadeville Loop- a former Central of Georgia rail line.

Misc.

Examples of extra trackage not owned by Norfolk Southern (only some are included)
Chemical Lime Lead- Alabama Division
Georgia Pacific Lead- Alabama Division 
International Paper Lead- Alabama Division 
Gulf States Paper Lead- Alabama Division 
Segco Mine Tracks- Alabama Division 
Nauvoo Coal Track- Alabama Division
Jasper Lumber Company Spur- Alabama Division
Canadian National Railway State Docks Lead- Alabama Division
Kroger Leads- Georgia Division
Stevens Graphics Track- Georgia Division
Arch Chemical Track- Georgia Division
Rayonier Lead- Georgia Division
Seaboard Construction Industrial Track- Georgia Division
General Electric Hydro Switch- Georgia Division
Boyle Midway Upper Track- Georgia Division 
General Electric Lead- Georgia Division
Huber Lead- Georgia Division
Chattahoochee Industrial Railroad CIRR Lead Hilton- Georgia Division
Harlee Lead- Georgia Division, defunct
ECOLAB Track- Georgia Division
GA Power Loop Track- Georgia Division

Not sure
AAR Connection Track at Prillaman Chemical Company- Alabama Division
Vulcan Lead- Alabama Division 
Crystex Track- Alabama Division
Stone Mountain Lead- Alabama Division and Georgia Division
Stone Mountain Industrial Area and Stone Mountain Industrial Lead- Alabama Division and Georgia Division
L.B. Foster Track- Alabama Division and Georgia Division
Decatur Street Belt Line- Alabama Division and Georgia Division

See also
List of CSX Transportation lines
High Point, Thomasville and Denton Railroad
Georgia Southern and Florida Railway- GS&F Main Line (or GS&F Main Track and GS&F District Main Track), Norfolk Southern Georgia Division

Notes

References

 
Norfolk Southern